Dinocerata (from the Greek , "terrible", and , "horn") is an extinct order of plant-eating hoofed mammals with horns and protuberant canine teeth.

Classification 
A 2015 phylogenetic study recovered Dinocerata as closely related to Carodnia, making them part of the Euungulata assemblage.

Taxonomy and phylogeny
Most experts place the known genera of Dinocerata within one family, Uintatheriidae, and split it into two subfamilies, Uintatheriinae and Gobiatheriinae. Some experts prefer to split Uintatheriidae into three families, with Gobiatherium placed in the monogeneric family Gobiatheriidae, the other Eocene genera in Uintatheriidae proper, and the Paleocene genera Prodinoceras and Probathyopsis placed in the family "Prodinoceratidae".

Laurasiatheria
Ungulatomorpha?
Order Dinocerata
Family Uintatheriidae
Subfamily Gobiatheriinae
Gobiatherium
Subfamily Uintatheriinae
Prodinoceras
Probathyopsis
Bathyopsis
Uintatherium
Eobasileus
Tetheopsis

References

Eocene extinctions
Paleocene first appearances
Fossil taxa described in 1872
Mammal orders